The 2016–17 EHF Champions League was the 57th edition of Europe's premier club handball tournament and the 24th edition under the current EHF Champions League format. Vardar were crowned champions for the first time, defeating Paris Saint-Germain Handball

Competition format
Twenty-eight teams participated in the competition, divided in four groups. Groups A and B were played with eight teams each, in a round robin, home and away format. The top team in each group qualified directly for the quarter-finals, the bottom two in each group dropped out of the competition and the remaining 10 teams qualified for the first knock-out phase.

In groups C and D, six teams played in each group in a round robin format, playing both home and away. The top two teams in each group then met in a ‘semi-final’ play-off, with the two winners going through to the first knock-out phase. The remaining teams dropped out of the competition.

Knock-out Phase 1 (Last 16)
12 teams played home and away in the first knock-out phase, with the 10 teams qualified from groups A and B and the two teams qualified from groups C and D.

Knock-out Phase 2 (Quarterfinals)
The six winners of the matches in the first knock-out phase joined with the winners of groups A and B to play home and away for the right to play in the Velux EHF Final4.

Final four
The culmination of the season, the Velux EHF Final4, continued in its existing format, with the four top teams from the competition competing for the title.

Team allocation

26 teams were directly qualified for the group stage.

TH = Title holders

Round and draw dates
The qualification and group stage draw was held in Glostrup, Denmark.

Qualification stage

The draw was held on 29 June 2016 at 13:00 in Vienna, Austria. The eight teams were split in two groups and played a semifinal and final to determine the last participants. Matches were played on 3 and 4 September 2016.

Qualification tournament 1

Qualification tournament 2

Group stage

The draw for the group stage was held on 1 July 2016 at 13:00 in the Vienna city centre. The 28 teams were drawn into four groups, two containing eight teams (Groups A and B) and two containing six teams (Groups C and D). The only restriction is that teams from the same national association could not face each other in the same group. Since Germany qualified three teams, the lowest seeded side (Kiel) was drawn with one of the other two.

In each group, teams played against each other in a double round-robin format, with home and away matches.

After completion of the group stage matches, the knockout stage was determined in the following manner:

Groups A and B – the top team qualified directly for the quarterfinals, and the five teams ranked 2nd–6th advanced to the first knockout round.
Groups C and D – the top two teams from both groups contested a playoff to determine the last two sides joining the 10 teams from Groups A and B in the first knockout round.

Group A

Group B

Group C

Group D

Playoffs

Knockout stage

The first-placed team from the preliminary groups A and B advanced to the quarterfinals, while the 2–6th placed teams advanced to the round of 16 alongside the playoff winners.

Round of 16

Quarterfinals

Final four

Final

Statistics

Top goalscorers
Statistics exclude qualifying rounds.

Awards

The All-star team of the Champions League 2016/17:

See also
2016–17 EHF Cup
2016–17 EHF Challenge Cup
2016–17 Women's EHF Champions League

References

External links
Official website

 
EHF Champions League seasons
EHF Champions League
EHF Champions League